The Alexandropol uezd, known after 1924 as the Leninakan uezd, was a county (uezd) of the Erivan Governorate of the Caucasus Viceroyalty of the Russian Empire. The uezd bordered the governorate's Etchmiadzin and Nor Bayazet uezds to the south, the Borchaly and Akhalkalaki uezds of the Tiflis Governorate to the north, the Kazakh uezd of the Elizavetpol Governorate to the east, and the Kars Oblast to the west. The area of the uezd included most of the contemporary Shirak Province, and southern parts of the Lori Province of Armenia. The district was eponymously named for its administrative center, Aleksandropol (present-day Gyumri), which at the time was a major railway hub of the Russian South Caucasus.

History 
The district of Alexandropol was established in 1840 as part of the Georgia-Imeretia Governorate of the Caucasus Viceroyalty, owing its name to its administrative capital, Alexandropol, which was renamed from Kumayri in 1837 during a visit of Tsar Nicholas I in honor of his wife Alexandra Feodorovna. In 1849, the Alexandropol uezd was assigned to the succeeding Tiflis Governorate, and later, by 1849, the county was transferred to the Erivan Governorate.

Following the Russian Revolution and the signing of the Treaty of Brest-Litovsk, local Armenian forces led by General Tovmas Nazabekian in early 1918 fought to defend Alexandropol and its surrounds against the invading Ottoman Third Army, commanded by General Vehib Pasha. The Treaty of Batum which was imposed on the newly-created Armenian republic stripped it of the Alexandropol uezd, assigning the district to the Ottoman Empire, which sought complete control over the city of Alexandropol for its vitally important railway junction connecting to Julfa and Persia where the Ottoman Army was active.

The city including its strategically important fortress and railway was unoccupied after months of occupation by the last Ottoman troops on 5 December 1918, following the Mudros Armistice in which the Ottoman Army was compelled to withdraw from parts of the former Russian Transcaucasus. After the Ottoman evacuation which was overseen by Mehmed Alfa, rubble cluttered the streets, homes had been looted and hundreds of thousands of animals were taken away, thus depriving the district of its ability to produce agricultural output.

After Alexandropol and its peripheries had been incorporated into Armenia, some 60,000 Armenians refugees exiled from the Kars Oblast gathered in the city, sheltering in the old Russian army barracks as they awaited permission to cross the Arpachay (Akhuryan) river to return to their homes.

During the Armenian-Turkish war, the city was again occupied by Turkish forces on 7 November 1920 and served as the place of negotiations between General Kâzım Karabekir and a delegation of the Armenian government led by Prime Minister Simon Vratsian. On 3 December 1920, the eponymous Treaty of Alexandropol was signed in the city, in which Armenia rescinded its claims to lands west of the Akhuryan and Aras rivers.

Some time after the establishment of Soviet power in Armenia, the district and city of Alexandropol were renamed to Leninakan in honor of Bolshevik leader Vladimir Lenin. By 1930, the uezd was reorganized into the raions of Ani, Akhuryan, Amasia, Aragats, Artik, Ashotsk, Gugark, and Spitak.

Administrative divisions 
The subcounties (uchastoks) of the Alexandropol uezd in 1913 were as follows:

Demographics

Russian Empire Census 
The majority of the population indicated Armenian to be their mother tongue, with significant Tatar, Russian, and Kurdish speaking minorities.

Kavkazskiy kalendar 

Soviet census (1926) 
According to the 1926 Soviet Census, the population of the uezd was 166,793, of whom, Armenians were 146.257 (87.7%), Turks – 147 (0.1%), Kurds – 7,469 (4.5%), and Russians – 2,041 (1.2%).

Notes

References

Bibliography 

Gyumri
Shirak Province
Uezds of Erivan Governorate